Headlines was a segment that aired weekly on The Tonight Show with Jay Leno. It also aired on the prime-time spin-off The Jay Leno Show. The segment usually aired on Monday nights. It was first seen in 1987, when Leno was still a guest host on The Tonight Show Starring Johnny Carson, and continued (even after Leno became permanent host in 1992) until Jay Leno left The Tonight Show in 2014.

This segment reappeared on TV as part of a new version of the game show You Bet Your Life hosted by Leno beginning in 2021. Viewers submitted newspaper headlines or other articles from all over the world, and the clippings contain either (but not limited to) a misspelled word, juxtaposed image or badly structured sentences that comically (and often in an unintentionally risqué way) completely change the meaning of what the writer intended.

Influence
Since the early 1980s, David Letterman had been doing a similar segment called "Small Town News" (albeit on and off) on The David Letterman Show, Late Night with David Letterman and Late Show with David Letterman. Conan O'Brien parodied "Headlines" on Late Night with Conan O'Brien in a segment called Actual Items, which uses advertisements purposefully doctored by the show's prop and writing staffs. Jimmy Fallon includes an updated version called "Screengrabs" (which uses online media), on The Tonight Show Starring Jimmy Fallon.

On December 18, 2006, both Letterman and Leno included in their segments an item in The Dallas Morning News about Letterman, which included a photograph of Leno.

In January 2010, during the replacement of O'Brien as Tonight Show host, Letterman ran a fake promo (featuring former Tonight announcer Edd Hall) for the return of Leno to The Tonight Show, referring to "Headlines" as "the bit [Leno] stole from Letterman's late-night show".

Publications
Leno released several compilations of Headlines during the late 1980s and early 1990s:
Headlines: Real but Ridiculous Headlines from America's Newspapers
More Headlines
Headlines III: Not The Movie, Still The Book
Headlines IV: The Next Generation
Jay Leno's Police Blotter: Real-Life Crime Headlines
All profits from sale of the books went to charity, most notably the Samuel Jared Kushnick Foundation.

Wil B. Strange includes "personal ads from the book 'Jay Leno's Headlines'" in an issue of Campus Life.

References

Headlines
The Tonight Show with Jay Leno
Television series segments